Trinity Church, on Queen Anne Square in Newport, Rhode Island, is a historic parish church in the Episcopal Diocese of Rhode Island. Founded in 1698, it is the oldest Episcopal parish in the state. In the mid 18th century, the church was home to the largest Anglican congregation in New England.

The current Georgian building was designed by architect Richard Munday and constructed in 1725–26. It one of the largest extant 18th century New England churches and has been designated a National Historic Landmark since 1968.

History
The Newport, Rhode Island congregation began to gather about 1698. When Richard Coote, 1st Earl of Bellomont was investigating charges of the infractions of the Navigation Acts in Rhode Island, he requested that the Board of Trade send a minister from England to Rhode Island. The first church structure was built in 1700.

The present church building was constructed in 1725–26, designed by local builder Richard Munday, who based his designs on those that he had seen that Sir Christopher Wren had used in London churches in the late 17th century. The church's design is very similar to that of Old North Church in Boston. Trinity, however, was built entirely of wood. It is believed to be the only church building with its three-tiered wineglass pulpit remaining in its original position in the center of the aisle, in front of the altar. The building was enlarged in 1764, but otherwise retains its original character with box pews.

In 1731, Dean George Berkeley donated the first organ, whose wooden case, decorated with the Crown of England and the mitres of the archbishops of Canterbury and York, survives in place. The first organist was Charles Theodore Pachelbel, son of the famous German Baroque composer Johann Pachelbel.

The church was used as a garrison church by the British Army in 1776–1778. Local oral tradition reports that George Washington attended services there in 1781. The Chevalier de Ternay, the French admiral who died in December 1780, is buried in the churchyard.

Also interred here is Dr. Sylvester Gardiner, who in 1753 purchased an immense tract of Maine wilderness where he founded what is now the city of Gardiner.  Many members of the Vanderbilt family attended the church when summering in Newport.

Historical architect, Norman Isham, restored several parts of the church in the 1920s.  The church has been seen in several films, including Amistad, Moonrise Kingdom and Evening. The burial service for former Rhode Island Senator Claiborne Pell was held at the church in January 2009.

The Rev. Canon Timothy Watt became Rector of the Parish in July, 2020.

Notable clergy
 The Rev. George Berkeley
 The Rev. Theodore Dehon
 The Rev. James Honyman
 The Rev. Jeremiah Leaming
 The Rev. Walter Lowrie
 The Rev. Lauriston L. Scaife
 The Rev. Dr. Francis Vinton

Notable organists
Charles Theodore Pachelbel
William Selby

Notable parishioners
John Jacob Astor VI
Thomas Breese, U.S. Navy chaplain, Battle of Lake Erie
 Rear Admiral Henry E. Eccles
Silvester Gardiner
 Rear Admiral Stephen B. Luce
George Champlin Mason, Sr.
Clement Clarke Moore
 Vice President of the United States Levi Morton
Richard Munday
Claiborne Pell
 Commodore Oliver Hazard Perry
 Commodore Matthew C. Perry
 Vice Admiral William S. Pye
 Colonel Henry Sherburne (colonel)
 Admiral Raymond Spruance
Gilbert Stuart
George P. Wetmore
Cornelius Vanderbilt II

See also

List of National Historic Landmarks in Rhode Island
National Register of Historic Places listings in Newport County, Rhode Island

References

Further reading

Gallery

External links

Episcopal churches in Rhode Island
National Historic Landmarks in Rhode Island
Churches in Newport, Rhode Island
Georgian architecture in Rhode Island
Churches completed in 1726
Churches on the National Register of Historic Places in Rhode Island
18th-century Episcopal church buildings
Historic American Buildings Survey in Rhode Island
1726 establishments in the Thirteen Colonies
National Register of Historic Places in Newport, Rhode Island
Individually listed contributing properties to historic districts on the National Register in Rhode Island